Coolidge is a ghost town in Price County, Wisconsin, United States. The town was marked on USGS maps as late as 1941 and is still marked on Wisconsin Department of Transportation maps.

History
Coolidge was one of the first settlements in the Town of Fifield along the Wisconsin Central Railroad. The town was set up as a flag station for the railway in November 1886. It consisted of two stores, a boarding house, post office and a saw and planing mill. The latter was built by W. H. Coolidge in 1884.

When Boyington and Atwell of Stevens Point built their sawmill at the sight known as Fifield, Coolidge had a population of 500. The mill operated until 1891 and had a pine cut of over 80,000,000 board feet.

According to Fifield: A History, by Douglas Severt, all that is left of Coolidge today is a pile of stone in the clearing that was once the company's vault. Near this same stone pile stands a huge spreading lilac bush that blossom every spring, as if in memorial to the past. William Ehmke was born at Coolidge and later became section boss on the Wisconsin Central as was his father before him.

References 

Geography of Price County, Wisconsin
Ghost towns in Wisconsin